The C510 is one of the mobile phones in Sony Ericsson's Cyber-shot series. Released on 7 January 2009, it was a successor to the K510i model. It is widely characterised as one of Sony Ericsson best non-smartphone devices released to the market.

Features

 The C510 is one of the first mobile phones to come integrated with Smile Shutter technology. Along with face detection this feature automatically takes a photo when a person smiles. This feature was later added to the C905 model. The phone can also play YouTube videos, upload pictures to the blogging site Blogger and comes with Facebook integrated.

The phone also has a protector for the camera, scratch-resistant display and buttons with blue illumination while in shooting mode for features such as flash. The phone also offers a large selection of settings for exposure and a built in photo editor.

Performance
The camera can shoot at up to 3.2 MP and can record video at 30 frame/s in QVGA format. A firmware upgrade will allow the phone to run processes such as Windows Live Messenger. The phone supports auto rotation for portrait to landscape via the built-in accelerometer which is also used for various other applications such as a step counter (Walk Mate) and some games. The phone has the ability to work as a modem, and in a good 3G signal area up to reasonable broadband speeds can be achieved. It supports memory cards up to 8 GB in capacity via the Memory Stick Micro port.

Java Platform 8
The C510 has Sony Ericsson Java Platform 8 profile and so allows Flash Lite to run as a front-end to Java ME.

References

 http://www.gsmarena.com/sony_ericsson_c510-2640.php
 
 https://web.archive.org/web/20010525040028/http://sonyericsson.com/

External links
 
 

Cyber-shot cameras
Sony Ericsson mobile phones
Mobile phones introduced in 2009